In enzymology, a 3-methyleneoxindole reductase is an enzyme that catalyzes the chemical reaction

3-methyl-1,3-dihydroindol-2-one + NADP+  3-methylene-1,3-dihydro-2H-indol-2-one + NADPH + H+

Thus, the two substrates of this enzyme are 3-methyl-1,3-dihydroindol-2-one and NADP+, whereas its three products are 3-methylene-1,3-dihydro-2H-indol-2-one, NADPH, and H+.

This enzyme belongs to the family of oxidoreductases, specifically those acting on the CH-CH group of donor with NAD+ or NADP+ as acceptor.  The systematic name of this enzyme class is 3-methyl-1,3-dihydroindol-2-one:NADP+ oxidoreductase. This enzyme is also termed 3-methyloxindole:NADP+ oxidoreductase.

References

 

EC 1.3.1
NADPH-dependent enzymes
Enzymes of unknown structure